Westerstede  (Low German: Westerstäe) is the capital of the Ammerland district, in Lower Saxony, Germany. It is situated approximately 25 km northwest of Oldenburg.

It is known for hosting the Rhodo Festival, the biggest exhibition of rhododendrons in Europe. The festival is hosted every four years (next time in 2023).

The villages of Burgforde, Eggeloge, Felde, Fikensolt, Garnholt, Gießelhorst, Halsbek, Halstrup, Hollriede, Hollwege, Hollwegerfeld, Hüllstede, Ihausen, Ihorst, Karlshof, Linswege, Linswegerfeld, Mansie, Lindern, Moorburg, Neuengland, Ocholt, Ocholterfeld, Ollenharde, Petersfeld, Tarbarg, Torsholt, Westerloy, Westerloyerfeld and Westerstederfeld are part of Westerstede.

The railway station of Westerstede is located in the village of Ocholt, 6 km south of the town. Trains from and to Leer and Oldenburg halt there every hour.

The community (and the whole Ammerland region) is famous for its tree nurseries. They grow rhododendrons that are sold outside Germany as well. The slightly acid pet soil is very suitable for this type of horticulture.

Near Linswege village,  7 km north-east of Westerstede, a Rhododendron Park has been established next to a beautiful wooded area. The park is open to visitors in May and June every year.

Mayor
The mayor of Westerstede is since 2019 Michael Rösner (UWG).

Notable people

 Wolfgang Hackbusch (born 1948), mathematician
 Eilhardus Lubinus (1565–1621), professor of poetics, theology, mathematics, geography, and Rector of the University of Rostock
 Bruno Steinhoff (born 1937), billionaire businessman, founder of Steinhoff International
 Friedrich Tietjen (1834–1895), astronomer

External links
 Pictures from spring festival in Westerstede
 Rhodo Festival

References

Ammerland